

Assamese newspapers
Amar Asom
Asomiya Khabar
Asomiya Pratidin
Dainik Agradoot
Dainik Asam
Dainik Janambhumi
Dainik Gana Adhikar
Janasadharan
Niyomiya Barta

Assamese magazines

Literary magazines
Assam Sahitya Sabha Patrika
Goriyoshi
Prantik

Popular entertainment journals
Bismoi
Purbodix

External links
Popular publications in Assam
Assamese News Paper list

Magazines
Magazines
Magazines
Assamese
Assamese magazines